Crumillospongia is a genus of middle Cambrian sponges known from the Burgess Shale and other localities from the Lower and Middle Cambrian.  Its name is derived from the Latin crumilla ("money purse") and spongia ("sponge"), a reflection of its similarity to a small leathery money purse. That is, it has a saclike shape, and its wall has holes of two sizes, with a well-developed internal canal system.  49 specimens of Crumillospongia are known from the Greater Phyllopod bed, where they comprise 0.1% of the community.

References

External links 
 

Burgess Shale fossils
Protomonaxonida
Burgess Shale sponges
Prehistoric sponge genera
Fossil taxa described in 1986
Cambrian genus extinctions
Wheeler Shale